Hainggyi Island (also spelt Haigyi Island or Hainggyikyun) is a town on the island of Hainggyi Island located at the mouth of the Pathein River (formerly Bassein River)  in the Ayeyarwady Region of south-west Myanmar. It is the primary town within Hainggyikyun Subtownship within Ngapudaw Township in the Pathein District.

The Pammawaddy Regional Command of the Myanmar Navy is headquartered in Hainggyi Island. The naval base used to host a few PLA personnel from china. According to Andrew Selth, claims of a massive PLA base on Hainggyi Island is plainly incorrect and gained popularity because of hysterical quotations by commentators.

References 

Populated places in Ayeyarwady Region